Soonchunhyang University Hospital is a hospital in Bucheon, South Korea. It is affiliated with Soonchunhyang University. There are several other soonchunhyang hospitals in Seoul, Cheonan, and Gumi.

Facilities

Soonchunhyang Bucheon Hospital
At Soonchunhyang Bucheon Hospital, there are two buildings. The older one, which is located at the north, and the newer one, which is located at the south.

There are wards in both buildings, however, there is more in the north wing.

The south wing consists of eye clinic, endoscopy and wards.

The north wing consists of The Department of Laboratory Medicine, the main lobby, and wards.

References

Teaching hospitals in South Korea
Hospitals established in 2001